Monika Schneider (born 12 August 1983) is a former professional tennis player from Poland.

Biography
Schneider, who was born in Siedlce, was ranked as high as 19th in the world during her junior career, which included wins over Jelena Janković and Svetlana Kuznetsova. A right-handed player, she played in two Fed Cup ties for Poland, against Slovenia and Romania in 2000. On the professional tour, she won two ITF doubles titles, both partnering Olga Brózda. Her last performance on the ITF Circuit was in November 2005.

Based in the UAE, Schneider works as a coach at Dubai's Elite Tennis Academy.

ITF Circuit finals

Singles: 1 (runner-up)

Doubles: 6 (2 titles, 4 runner-ups)

See also
 List of Poland Fed Cup team representatives

References

External links
 
 
 

1983 births
Living people
Polish female tennis players
People from Siedlce
Polish expatriate sportspeople in the United Arab Emirates
21st-century Polish women